is a retired Japanese women's professional shogi player ranked 5-dan.

Early life and education
Tanikawa was born on February 9, 1954, in Saitama Prefecture. She is a graduate of Aoyama Gakuin University.

JSA director and other offices
Tanikawa was elected to Japan Shogi Association's board of directors as a non-executive director in May 2011, and was reelected to the same position in June 2013 and June 2015.

Promotion history
Tanikawa's promotion history is as follows:
1976, September 23: 1-kyū
1978, September 10: 1-dan
1981, March 19: 2-dan
1989, May 22: 3-dan
2000, June 28: 4-dan
2011, April 1: 5-dan

Note: All ranks are women's professional ranks.

Titles and other championships
Tanikawa's only major title appearance came in 1980 when she challenged Akiko Takojima for the 3rd  title. She lost the match 2 games to none.

Awards and honors
Tanikawa received the Tokyo Shogi Journalists' Association's Annual Shogi Award for the April 2009March 2010 shogi year.

References

External links
 Japan Shogi Association official profile page 
 ShogiHub: Tanikawa, Harue

Japanese shogi players
Living people
Women's professional shogi players
Aoyama Gakuin University alumni
Professional shogi players from Saitama Prefecture
1954 births